General elections were held in Tristan da Cunha on 26 March 2019 to elect eight members of the Island Council and the Chief Islander.

Electoral system
The 12-member Island Council consists of the Administrator as President, three appointed members and eight elected members, who are elected by plurality-at-large voting. At least one elected member of the council must be a woman. If there are no women among the eight candidates that receive the most votes, only the top seven male candidates are declared elected, alongside the woman that received the highest number of votes. If there are no female candidates, a by-election is held for the eighth seat, in which only female candidates can stand.

The Chief Islander is elected on a separate ballot by first-past-the-post voting, and must also be elected to the Island Council to be eligible to become Chief Islander.

Campaign
A total of 13 candidates registered to contest the eight seats on the Island Council, whilst two, James Glass and Ian Lavarello, also stood for the post of Chief Islander.

Results
Of the 213 registered voters, 158 cast a vote, including nine by mean of a postal one, leading to a turnout of 74.18 %. Administrator Sean Burns designed three councillors immediately after the elections.

James Glass won against Ian Lavarello for the seat of Chief Islander, becoming the first to become one for the fourth time, albeit in a non consecutive manner. Ian Lavarello is the only member of the previous council to be part of the newly elected one.

Chief Islander

Island Council

List of Council members

References

Tristan da Cunha
Tristan
2019 in Saint Helena, Ascension and Tristan da Cunha
Tristan
March 2019 events in Africa